The 2009 FIA WTCC Race of Japan (formally the 2009 FIA WTCC Kenwood Race of Japan) was the eleventh round of the 2009 World Touring Car Championship season and the second running of the FIA WTCC Race of Japan. It was held on 1 November 2009 at the Okayama International Circuit near Mimasaka, Japan. The two races were won by BMW drivers Andy Priaulx and Augusto Farfus. The race was supported by the 2009 1000 km of Okayama, the inaugural event of the Asian Le Mans Series.

Background 
Gabriele Tarquini arrived in Japan with a seven-point lead over SEAT Sport teammate Yvan Muller. BMW Team Germany driver Augusto Farfus was the only other driver that could still win the title. He was eighteen points behind Tarquini.

SUNRED Engineering placed Japanese-based Brazilian João Paulo de Oliveira in their third car for the race, taking it over from Andrea Larini. Japanese drivers Seiji Ara and Nobuteru Taniguchi also made their championship debuts, for Wiechers-Sport and Proteam Motorsport respectively, while Masaki Kano returned to Liqui Moly Team Engstler, the team with which he made his series debut in 2008. Macau's Henry Ho also drove for Engstler, making his series debut. Independent SEAT drivers Marin Čolak and Mehdi Bennani did not travel to Japan, while Fabio Fabiani did not follow-up his one-off drive for Proteam at the previous race in Italy.

Report

Testing and free practice 
Yvan Muller was quickest in Friday's test session, ahead of Farfus and the SEAT trio of Tiago Monteiro, Rickard Rydell and Gabriele Tarquini.

Farfus set the fastest time in Saturday morning's free practice session, ahead of fellow BMW driver Andy Priaulx and SEAT drivers Jordi Gené, Yvan Muller and Tiago Monteiro. Stefano D'Aste crashed ten minutes into the session, bringing out the red flags and stopping the session.

Farfus was also the quickest in the second practice session, ahead of BMW Team Germany teammate Jörg Müller and his namesake Yvan. Robert Huff for Chevrolet and Tarquini were fourth and fifth quickest.

Qualifying
Tarquini took his third straight pole position and his fifth of the season in the qualifying session. He will start ahead of Priaulx, Jörg Müller, Rydell and Farfus. Yvan Muller will start in seventh place. Tom Coronel was the quickest of the Independent runners.

Warm-Up
Farfus set the quickest time in the Sunday morning warm-up, ahead of Gené, Jörg Müller, Rickard Rydell and Tiago Monteiro.

Race One

A heavy downfall of rain before the first race meant that the field began behind the safety car. The safety car came in at the end of the first lap, with polesitter Tarquini leading the pack. However, he drifted wide at Turn 2 through the gravel trap. This left Priaulx to lead until the end of the race, despite pressure from BMW teammate Jörg Müller. Despite dropping back after his off-track excursion, Tarquini came back through the field to finish in fifth behind Huff and Yvan Muller, ahead of SEAT teammates Gené and Monteiro. Farfus had gone off at the same time as Tarquini on lap 3, but he fought his way through to finish eighth and securing pole position for Race Two after pushing Alain Menu wide on the penultimate lap, continuing his habit this season off recovering from early Race One incidents to finish eighth and start Race Two on pole. Coronel took the Independents' class victory.

Race Two

Race Two began with Jörg Müller starting quickly, causing a bunch-up at Turn 1 that resulted in Müller spinning Monteiro off the track. Tarquini joined him in running off, although he was able to rejoin the circuit. Müller received a drive-through penalty for causing the incident. Many other drivers ran wide at Turn 2 in the treacherous conditions. Farfus lead Priaulx home to give another one-two finish for BMW, ahead of Yvan Muller. The three Chevrolets finished next, with Menu ahead of Nicola Larini and Huff. Gené and Rydell sacrificed their positions on the last lap to give teammate Tarquini a seventh-place finish. D'Aste took the Independents' win, finishing tenth overall

Results

Qualifying

Race 1

Bold denotes Fastest lap.

Race 2

Bold denotes Fastest lap.

Standings after the event

Drivers' Championship standings

Yokohama Independents' Trophy standings

Manufacturers' Championship standings

 Note: Only the top five positions are included for both sets of drivers' standings.

References

External links

 Results Booklet PDF at MST Systems

Japan
Race of Japan